The A200 is an A road in London running from London Bridge to Greenwich. It runs east from the A3 road along Duke Street Hill, then Tooley Street and Jamaica Road, following the River Thames until the junction with Rotherhithe Tunnel when it turns south down Lower Road. It follows the Thames again in Deptford, after passing Surrey Quays and becoming Evelyn Street. At the junction with Deptford Church Street it turns due east along Creek Road, over Deptford Creek to finish by the Cutty Sark at Greenwich Church Street, part of the A206 road.

Cycleway 4 will follow most of the A200 road.

Route

Tooley Street

The name derives from St Olave's Street, after the Church of St Olave. For much of its history the street has been lined with warehouses, and in 1861 Scovell's warehouse caught fire, resulting in the largest peacetime fire in the Port of London.

Jamaica Road

Tooley Street becomes Jamaica Road at Shad Thames. A little over halfway down (from the Tower Bridge end) lies Bermondsey Underground station, which is served by the Jubilee line. A thoroughfare of shops follows, and the road continues on until Culling Circus roundabout, where it turns roughly 90 degrees south towards Deptford and becomes Lower Road. Brunel Road and the Rotherhithe Tunnel also meet at this junction. King's Stairs Gardens and Southwark Park lie at the south-eastern end.

Lower Road

Southwark Park runs the length of Lower Road, to the west.

Evelyn Street

Named after diarist John Evelyn, the street runs from the Plough Way junction south to the junction with Deptford Church Street. There is both a McDonald's and a KFC along this stretch.

Creek Road
Creek Road continues over a lifting bridge at Deptford Creek then joins the A206 at the Greenwich one-way system by the Cutty Sark.

References

Streets in London
Roads in England
Streets in the Royal Borough of Greenwich
Streets in the London Borough of Southwark